The following is a timeline of the history of the city of Wilmington, Delaware, USA.

Prior to 19th century

 1638
 March 29: Peter Minuit and others arrive at what is known today as Swedes' Landing, in the Swedish colony of New Sweden.
 Fort Christina built on behalf of the Swedish South Company; settlement known as Christinaham.
 1655 - Fort taken from Swedes by Dutch forces of Peter Stuyvesant.
 1664 - English in power.
 1682 - New Sweden becomes part of the English colonial Province of Pennsylvania.
 1698 - Holy Trinity Church (Old Swedes) built.
 1731 - Landowner Thomas Willing names his property "Willingtown" (renamed "Wilmington" around 1739).
 1739
 William Shipley becomes burgess of Wilmington.
 Shipbuilding industry begins (approximate date).
 1740 - First Presbyterian Church built.
 1748 - Wilmington Friends School established.
 1777 - September 11: Battle of Brandywine fought near town.
 1785 - Delaware Gazette newspaper begins publication.
 1788 - Wilmington Library Company founded.
 1798
 Yellow fever outbreak.
 Town Hall built.

19th century

 1802 - DuPont gunpowder manufacturer in business at Eleutherian Mills on Brandywine Creek near Wilmington.
 1809 - Borough of Wilmington expanded.
 1814 - Harmonic Society formed.
 1824 - "First public opinion poll" taken in Wilmington during the U.S. presidential election campaign.
 1832
 Borough of Wilmington becomes a city per state charter.
 Richard H. Bayard becomes city mayor.
 1835 - Wilmington Whaling Company incorporated.
 1837
 Board of Trade and Wesleyan Female Seminary established.
 Betts, Pusey & Harlan railcar manufactory in business.
 1838 - Philadelphia, Wilmington and Baltimore Railroad begins operating.
 1840
 Democratic Free Press newspaper begins publication.
 Population: 8,367.
 1849 - Harlan and Hollingsworth shipbuilder and railcar manufactory in business.
 1855 - Customshouse built.
 1864
 Horse-drawn railway begins operating.
 Historical Society of Delaware headquartered in Wilmington.
 John Merrick House built.
 1868 - Roman Catholic Diocese of Wilmington established.
 1871 - Grand Opera House built.
 1877 - Wilmington Club for men incorporated.
 1880 – Population: 42,478.
 1881 - New Castle County Court House built.
 1886 - Brandywine Park established.
 1889 - Rockford Park and New Century Club for women established.
 1890
 Delaware Hospital opens.
 Population: 61,431.
 1900 – Population: 76,508.

20th century

 1905 - Brandywine Zoo established.
 1910 – Population: 87,411.
 1911 - Majestic Theatre opens.
 1917 - Rodney Square established.
 1919 - Wilmington, Delaware race riot of 1919
 1920 – Population: 110,168.
 1921 - City fire department established.
 1922 - WDEL and WILM radio begin broadcasting.
 1923
 Wilmington Marine Terminal built.
 Monument to Caesar Rodney installed in Rodney Square.
 1928 - Rodney Court apartment building constructed.
 1929 - Wilmington Dry Goods in business.
 1930 - Population: 106,597.
 1937 - Main Post Office built.
 1942 - Crest Theater in business.
 1950 – Population: 110,356.
 1961 - Burton v. Wilmington Parking Authority lawsuit decided by U.S Supreme Court, broadening the Equal Protection Clause of the U.S. Constitution's 14th Amendment.
 1965 - Wilmington Medical Center active.
 1968 - Wilmington Riot of 1968
 1981 - State legislature passes the "liberalizing" Financial Center Development Act, influencing the relocation of many banks to the Wilmington area.
 1991 - Cinemark cinema in business.
 1995 - MBNA Corporation headquartered in city.
 1996 - City website online (approximate date).

21st century

 2001 - James M. Baker becomes mayor.
 2013 - Dennis P. Williams becomes mayor.

See also
 Wilmington, Delaware history
 List of mayors of Wilmington, Delaware
 National Register of Historic Places listings in Wilmington, Delaware

References

Bibliography

Published in the 18th–19th c.

Published in the 20th c.
 
 
 
  (fulltext)
  + chronology
  (fulltext)
  (fulltext)
 
  (fulltext)
  (fulltext)

Published in the 21st c.

External links

 
 
 Items related to Wilmington, Delaware, various dates (via Digital Public Library of America).

Wilmington, Delaware
Wilmington
Delaware-related lists
wilmington
Years in Delaware